Otto Andersson may refer to:

Otto Andersson (musicologist) (1879–1969), Finnish musicologist
Otto Andersson (politician) (1881–1925), Finnish politician
Otto Andersson (footballer) (1910–1977), Swedish footballer